Grand Inquisitor (literally Inquisitor General or General Inquisitor) was the lead official of the Inquisition. The title usually refers to the chief inquisitor of the Spanish Inquisition, even after the reunification of the inquisitions. Secretaries-general of the Roman Inquisition were often styled as Grand Inquisitor but the role and functions were different.

The Portuguese Inquisition was headed by a Grand Inquisitor, or General Inquisitor, named by the Pope but selected by the king, always from within the royal family.

The most famous Inquisitor General was the Spanish Dominican Tomás de Torquemada, who spearheaded the Spanish Inquisition.

List of Spanish Grand Inquisitors

Separation of Inquisitions of Castile and Aragon

Castile

Aragon

Reunification of the Inquisitions

List of inquisitors-general of Portugal

External links
  Council of Inquisition: List of Grand Inquisitors

References

Spanish Inquisition
Portuguese Inquisition
Grand